Innocent Bystander may refer to:

Films and television
Innocent Bystander (film), a 1972 film directed by Peter Collinson
 There Are No Innocent Bystanders, a documentary about The Libertines

Music

Innocent Bystander (band), a Vancouver-based Canadian band, also part of the Canadian hip hop collective Sweatshop Union
"Innocent Bystander", a song on Korn's untitled album
Innocent Bystanders, a Perth-based Australian band